The Ayden Historic District is a national historic district located at Ayden, Pitt County, North Carolina.  The  district encompasses 319 contributing buildings and six contributing structures in the town of Ayden.  It includes buildings dated from the late-19th to mid-20th century and notable examples of Bungalow / American Craftsman, Colonial Revival, and Queen Anne architecture.  Notable buildings include the original Ayden Town Hall (1915), Turnage Brothers Building (c. 1914), Moore House (c. 1890), John Stanley Hart House (c. 1893), Thelbert Worthington House (1930) designed by Leila Ross Wilburn, Ayden Baptist Church (1941), the Lloyd and Lillian Turnage House (1923) and Ayden Methodist Church (1926) designed by Benton & Benton Associates, Zion Chapel Free Will Baptist Church (1924), and Mount Olive Baptist Church (c. 1915).

It was listed on the National Register of Historic Places in 1994.

References

Historic districts on the National Register of Historic Places in North Carolina
Queen Anne architecture in North Carolina
Colonial Revival architecture in North Carolina
Geography of Pitt County, North Carolina
Buildings and structures in Pitt County, North Carolina
National Register of Historic Places in Pitt County, North Carolina